Jannik Madum Andersen (born 29 March 1940) is a Danish rower. He competed in the men's double sculls event at the 1960 Summer Olympics.

References

1940 births
Living people
Danish male rowers
Olympic rowers of Denmark
Rowers at the 1960 Summer Olympics
People from Nakskov